Halle may refer to:

Places

Germany
 Halle (Saale), also called Halle an der Saale, a city in Saxony-Anhalt
 Halle (region), a former administrative region in Saxony-Anhalt
 Bezirk Halle, a former administrative division of East Germany
 Halle-Neustadt, a former city
 Halle (Westfalen), a town in North Rhine-Westphalia
 Halle, Bentheim, in the district of Bentheim, Lower Saxony
 Halle, Holzminden, in the district of Holzminden, Lower Saxony
 Halle (Heve), a river of North Rhine-Westphalia, Germany

Elsewhere
 Halle, Belgium, a city and municipality
 Halle, Netherlands, a village in the Netherlands
 Halle Range, a mountain range in Greenland

People
 Halle (name), a given name and a surname (including a list of people with the name)
 Halle (singer) (born 1986), Nigerian actress, singer-songwriter and dancer

Other uses
 Battle of Halle, a clash in 1806 at Halle, Saxony-Anhalt
 Halle fireboat, one of the fireboats of Duluth
 Halle (album), an album by the Japanese fusion band Casiopea
 Halle Brothers Co., a defunct department store chain
their Halle Building
 Halle concentration camp, a subcamp of Buchenwald concentration camp
 Halle Open, a men's tennis tournament
 Halle Trophy Race, an air race for women aviators
 The Hallé, a symphony orchestra based in Manchester, England
 University of Halle, now part of University of Halle-Wittenberg

See also
 Hall (disambiguation)
 Halla (disambiguation)
 Halley (disambiguation)
 Hallie (disambiguation)
 Hel (disambiguation)
 Hell (disambiguation)
 Hell
 Helle (disambiguation)